Exterminator 17 is a French comic written by Jean-Pierre Dionnet and  drawn by Enki Bilal. It appeared in Metal Hurlant magazine in 1979. A second trilogy, entitled La Trilogie d'Ellis and drawn by Igor Baranko, was published in 2003–2008.

References

 Bilal dans Metal Hurlant BDoubliees
 Exterminateur 17 editions BDgest, La bedetheque

External links
 Exterminator 17 English translation on Humanoids Publishing

1977 comics debuts
Comics by Enki Bilal
French comics
Science fiction comics
Métal Hurlant titles